Christopher William Parkening (born December 14, 1947) is an American classical guitarist. He holds the Chair of Classical Guitar at Pepperdine University under the title Distinguished Professor of Music.

Biography
Parkening was born in Los Angeles, California. His cousin Jack Marshall, a studio musician active in the 1960s, introduced Parkening to the recordings of Andrés Segovia when he was 11 and encouraged his classical guitar studies. By the age of 19 he had embarked on a professional career of regular touring and recording.

Segovia has stated that, "Christopher Parkening is a great artist—-he is one of the most brilliant guitarists in the world." The Washington Post stated, Christopher Parkening is “the leading guitar virtuoso of our day, combining profound musical insight with complete technical mastery of his instrument.”

At age 30, Parkening withdrew from public performances and recording seeking a respite from the demands of a professional career and a chance to pursue his hobby of flyfishing. During this period Parkening rarely played guitar choosing instead to focus his attention on his Montana ranch and trout stream. While visiting his Southern California home in winter, a neighbor invited Parkening to the Grace Community Church. Profoundly affected by this experience Parkening returned to recording and performing with a renewed sense of purpose" to glorify God with his music. He then released Simple Gifts, an album of traditional Christian hymns arranged for classical guitar. His autobiography Grace Like a River was published in 2006.

Parkening has recorded over 20 albums for Angel and EMI Classics. He has been nominated twice for a Grammy Award. Notable recordings include Parkening Plays Vivaldi featuring a selection of Baroque concertos, Pleasures of Their Company with soprano Kathleen Battle, produced by Patti Laursen and nominated for the 1986 Classical Record of the Year Grammy Award as well as the world premiere recording of Peter Warlock's Capriol Suite  with the Academy of St. Martin in the Fields.

As an educator, Parkening has been instrumental in cementing the guitar's reputation and esteem within academia. He created the guitar department at the University of Southern California in 1969, when he was only 22, and he was serving as the head of the department when he first retired from public performance at age 30. During his famous sabbatical from the guitar, spent mostly fly-fishing in Montana, he agreed to found a guitar department at Montana State University, and he did what he terms a "token" amount of teaching at MSU during this time. He was awarded an Honorary Doctor of Music from Montana State University in 1983. He is currently Distinguished Professor of Music and Chair in Classical Guitar at Pepperdine University, where, in addition to his work with guitar majors, he also teaches a public master class. In a 2013 interview, Parkening said that he is retired from the concert stage and is focused on his family and teaching.

Christopher Parkening lives with his wife, Theresa, and their son, Luke in Southern California.

Discography

LP
 In the Classic Style (1968), Angel
 In the Spanish Style (1968), Angel
 Romanza (1969), Angel
 Parkening Plays Bach (1972), Angel
 The Christopher Parkening Album (1973), Angel
 Parkening and the Guitar (1976), Angel (nominated for a Grammy® Award for "Best Classical Album of the Year")

CD
 Simple Gifts (1982), EMI/Angel
 A Bach Celebration with the Los Angeles Chamber Orchestra (1985), EMI/Angel
 Christopher Parkening Plays Bach (1985), EMI/Angel
 Pleasures of Their Company with Kathleen Battle (1986), EMI/Angel (Nominated for a Grammy® Award for "Best Classical Recording")
 In the Spanish Style (1986), EMI/Angel 
 Virtuoso Duets with David Brandon (1990), EMI/Angel 
 The Sounds of Christmas with Julie Andrews (1990), Hallmark Cards, Inc.
 A Tribute to Segovia (1991), EMI/Angel
 The Artistry of Christopher Parkening (1993), EMI/Angel
 The Great Recordings (1993), EMI/Angel
 Rodrigo: Concierto de Aranjuez; Walton: 5 Bagatelles with Andrew Litton and the Royal Philharmonic Orchestra (1993), EMI/Angel
 Christopher Parkening Plays Vivaldi Guitar Concertos & Warlock Capriol Suite (1994), EMI/Angel
 Angels' Glory with Kathleen Battle (1996), Sony Classical
 Christopher Parkening Celebrates Segovia (1998), EMI/Angel
 Stepmom film score with John Williams (1998), Sony Classical
 Elmer Bernstein – Concerto for Guitar – Albeniz – Marshall (2000), EMI/Angel
 Grace Like A River (2006), EMI/Angel
 Jubilation (2007) with Jubilant Sykes, EMI/Angel Records

DVD
 Virtuoso Performances (2008), Hal Leonard Corp.

References

Further reading
 Parkening, Christopher and Tyers, Kathy. Grace like a River. Carol Stream, IL: Tyndale, 2006.
 Brad Conroy interview with Christopher Parkneing, Guitar International

External links
 Christopher Parkening Official Website
 Parkening International Guitar Competition
 Christopher Parkening - Distinguished Professor of Music

1947 births
American classical guitarists
American male guitarists
Living people
Guitarists from Los Angeles
20th-century American guitarists
Classical musicians from California
20th-century American male musicians
21st-century American guitarists
21st-century American male musicians
Pepperdine University faculty
Montana State University faculty